Maireana sedifolia, also known as the bluebush or pearl bluebrush is a compact shrub endemic to Australia, and found in New South Wales, Victoria, South Australia, Western Australia, and the Northern Territory. It is used in pasture and as a garden plant where it is popular due to its distinctive grey foliage.

It was first described in 1855 by Ferdinand von Mueller as Kochia sedifolia, but was reassigned to the genus, Maireana, by Paul Wilson in 1975.

References

External links
 Maireana sedifolia Occurrence data from The Australasian Virtual Herbarium 

sedifolia
Flora of the Northern Territory
Flora of South Australia
Flora of Victoria (Australia)
Eudicots of Western Australia
Caryophyllales of Australia
Garden plants of Australia
Taxa named by Ferdinand von Mueller